Arksey is an English surname. Notable people with the surname include:

 Josh Arksey (born 1994), English cricketer
 Neil Arksey, British writer

See also
 

English toponymic surnames